Cube Action Team, is a professional mountain bike racing team competing in the World Cup and World Champs, as well as national level events, in the enduro category.

2015 Team roster

References

External links 
CUBE.eu

Mountain biking teams and clubs
Cycling in Germany
Cycling teams established in 2011
Cycling teams based in Germany